Jonas "Snäckan" Snäckmark (born 27 January 1986 in Halmstad, Halland County, Sweden) is a Swedish metal-singer who stood out as one of the eleven finalists in Idol 2006 - the Swedish version of Idol.

Idol 2006 Performances
Auditions, Gothenburg: "You Raise Me Up" - Josh Groban
Auditions, Stockholm: "Sorry Seems To Be The Hardest Word" - Elton John (Trio)
Semi Finals: "One" - U2
Top 11: "Higher" - Creed
Top 10: "Vi har bara varandra" - Thomas Di Leva
Top 9: "Here Without You" - 3 Doors Down
Top 8: "Alive" - Pearl Jam

Trivia

Snäckmark said that he had not watched a single episode of Idol previously and thinks that the whole TV-show is against his principle as a metalhead. The reason that Snäckmark still applied for Idol was because he had made a bet with his friends concerning it and lost.
Due to his choice of clothing (a kilt) during the 1st round final (29 April), Snäckmark was nicknamed "Braveheart" by jury member Peter Swartling.
He is currently the singer of the heavy metal band Aktaion, and plays bass for the rock band Honeyburst.

External links
snäckans blogg

Living people
1986 births
Swedish heavy metal singers
Idol (Swedish TV series) participants
Singers from Halmstad
21st-century Swedish singers
21st-century Swedish male singers